Neon is an EP by American electronic duo Versa self-released on January 21, 2014, as a "pay what you want" download via Bandcamp, and regular download on iTunes and Spotify. The EP is their first release as Versa, previously known as VersaEmerge.

Track listing

Personnel
Versa
 Sierra Kay – lead vocals
 Blake Harnage – lead guitar, vocals, producer on "Neon" and "Wanderlust"

Production
 Shaun Lopez – Producer on "Illusion"
 Andrew Dawson – Producer on "Illusion"
 Jeff Juliano – Mixing on "Neon" and "Wanderlust"
 Jim Monti – Mixing on "Illusion"
 Chris Athens – Mastering

References

External links
 Official website of Versa

2014 EPs
Versa (band) EPs